Floyd Arthur "Bud" Hillman (November 19, 1933 – May 26, 2020) was a Canadian professional ice hockey player who played six games in the National Hockey League for the Boston Bruins during the 1956–57 season. The rest of his career, which lasted from 1954 to 1964, was spent in various minor leagues.

He was the brother of two other NHL players: Larry Hillman and Wayne Hillman. He is also the uncle of Brian Savage.

Career statistics

Regular season and playoffs

References

External links
 

1933 births
2020 deaths
Canadian ice hockey defencemen
Boston Bruins players
Hershey Bears players
Ice hockey people from Ontario
Kingston Frontenacs (EPHL) players
Kitchener Greenshirts players
Oshawa Generals players
People from Essex County, Ontario
Providence Reds players
Quebec Aces (QSHL) players
San Francisco Seals (ice hockey) players
Springfield Indians players
Victoria Cougars (1949–1961) players
Windsor Bulldogs (1963–1964) players
Windsor Bulldogs (OHA) players